Spring Song, Op. 16, is a single-movement tone poem for orchestra written in 1894 by the Finnish composer Jean Sibelius.

The piece was initially composed as Improvisation for Orchestra, in the key of D major.  Sibelius recast it in F major, and retitled the work in 1895, appending the subtitle "The Sadness of Spring" to that (unpublished) version.

The piece contains an optimism that is relatively rare among Sibelius' works. It is known for its prominent use of bells at the end of the song.

Structure
The work is scored for 2 flutes (both doubling piccolo), 2 oboes, 2 clarinets (in B), 2 bassoons, 4 horns (in F), 3 trumpets (in F), 3 trombones, tuba, timpani, glocken, violins, violas, cellos and double basses. Spring Song takes about 8 minutes to play.

References

External links

Symphonic poems by Jean Sibelius
1894 compositions
1902 compositions
Compositions in F major